Last Orders is the debut self-titled album from English folk band Last Orders. It was released in July 2007 by Fellside Records.

Track listing 
All songs Traditional; except where noted.

 "Polkas" - 3:35
O'Keefe's Polka
Glen Cottage
Camptown Races (Stephen Foster)
 "Morgan Rattler" - 5:00
Barsebak Polka
Morgan Rattler
 "Go to Town" - 3:31
Go to Town (Emily Smith, Steve Byrne)
The Barrowburn Reel
 "G Polska"
Eklunda Polska
 "Jigs" - 4:50
Waiting for Janet (Andy Cutting)
Taking the Tent Down (Julian Sutton)
Horizonto (Paul James)
 "Air & Waltz" - 7:26
Calum Sgaire (Traditional, Alasdair Fraser)
The Gold Curtain (John Neilson)
 "Mr Isaac's Maggot" - 5:40
Steffans Leken
Mr. Isaac's Maggot
 "The Last of the Great Whales" - 4:23
 "Reels" - 4:25
Emma's Reel
Phil Cunningham's Reel (Traditional, Phil Cunningham)
Da Sneck o' da Smaalie
 "Dance Of Delight" - 6:23
Tune for Michael (Brian Finnegan)
Dance of Delight 
 "Bourrees" - 2:59
Van Praetbrug (Wouter Vandenabeele)
Reynaud's Bourree (Regis Reynaud)
 "Toulpagorni" - 5:11
Lapp-Lena Vals
Toulpagorni (Karl-Johan Andersson)

References 
 Track listing at HMV.co.uk

2007 debut albums
Last Orders (band) albums